Doreen Cantrell CBE, FRS, FRSE, FMedSci, is a scientist and Professor of Cellular Immunology at the School of Life Sciences, University of Dundee. She researches the development and activation T lymphocytes, which are key to the understanding the immune response.

Education
Cantrell received her bachelor's degree in Zoology in 1979 from the University College of Wales, Aberystwyth, and her PhD in Immunology in the Cancer Research Campaign Laboratory at the University of Nottingham.

Career
She made her first major contribution to the field in 1984, when she and Dr K A Smith published the first single cell analysis of lymphocyte proliferation.

From 1987 to 2002, she was Head of the Lymphocyte Activation Laboratory at the Cancer Research UK London Research Institute. In 2002, she was awarded a Wellcome Trust Principal Research Fellowship at the School of Life Sciences at the University of Dundee. She has served as  Chair of the UK Medical Research Council's Immunology and Infections panel ( 2010-2014) and was a member of MRC council (2014-2018). She is a member of the Editorial Board for Immunity.

She is a world expert on the function of T lymphocytes: the white blood cells which control the immune system and are consequently very important in understanding the progress of diseases and disease resistance.

Awards and honours
Cantrell was appointed Commander of the Order of the British Empire (CBE) in the 2014 New Year Honours for services to life sciences. She was elected a fellow of the Royal Society in 2011 for her work on immunology. She became a member of The Royal Society of Edinburgh in 2005.

References 

British women scientists
British immunologists
Commanders of the Order of the British Empire
Female Fellows of the Royal Society
Year of birth missing (living people)
Academics of the University of Dundee
Fellows of the Royal Society of Edinburgh
Wellcome Trust Principal Research Fellows
Fellows of the Academy of Medical Sciences (United Kingdom)
Alumni of Aberystwyth University
Alumni of the University of Nottingham
Living people